Walsum power plant is a coal-fired power station owned by Evonik Industries. It is in the Walsum quarter of Duisburg, on the area of the former Walsum coal mine.

Structure
It has an installed output capacity of 600 megawatts (MW). The chimney is 300 metres high, one of the highest chimneys in Germany. The power station supplies not only electricity but also process steam for the paper factory of the Norske Skog as well as long-distance heating and electricity to Fernwärmeschiene Niederrhein and the Walsum coal mine. From approximately 930,000 tons of coal, the power station produces approximately 2.2 billion a kWh electricity, 33 million a kWh of long-distance heating, 500,000 t process steam and 250 million m³ compressed air per year. It has a coal storage capacity of 34.000 t.

History

At the location Duisburg Walsum were established to 1928 a power plant for the covering of the need of the coal mine Walsum at steam. 1957 were extended it by a power station block (block 6) with 68 MW, 1959 and 1960 followed two power station blocks (block 7 and 8) with 150 MW each. 1988 replaced block 9 with an output of 410 MW the blocks 6 and 8. 2007 are to be begun with the building of the block 10 for a capacity of 700 megawatts (MW). Block 10 will be ready to start end of 2013 after serious problems with the high-tech steel of the boiler. June 30, 2007 the Walsum coal mine stopped down.

Coal-fired power stations in Germany
Towers in Germany
Buildings and structures in Duisburg
Economy of North Rhine-Westphalia